Malaya Topal is a rural locality (a selo) in Klintsovsky District, Bryansk Oblast, Russia. The population was 404 as of 2013. There are 3 streets.

Geography 
Malaya Topal is located 31 km south of Klintsy (the district's administrative centre) by road. Drovoseki is the nearest rural locality.

References 

Rural localities in Klintsovsky District